Bryn Griffiths (born 8 March 1982) is a Welsh rugby union player. A lock forward, he has represented Wales Youth, Wales under-19s and grand slam-winning Wales under-21s. Now retired, he has represented the Welsh regional teams Llanelli Scarlets, Newport Gwent Dragons and Cardiff Blues.

Griffiths was born in Ammanford.

References

External links
Newport Gwent Dragons profile
Cardiff Blues Profile

1982 births
Living people
Alumni of Swansea University
Cardiff Rugby players
Doncaster R.F.C. players
Dragons RFC players
Llanelli RFC players
Newport RFC players
People from Glanamman
Rugby union players from Ammanford
Rugby union players from Carmarthenshire
Welsh rugby union players
Rugby union locks